The year 1940 in architecture involved some significant architectural events and new buildings.

Events
 Oscar Niemeyer begins to design landmark public buildings around the artificial lake of Pampulha in Belo Horizonte, state of Minas Gerais in southeastern Brazil.
 The last of the White Pine Series of Architectural Monographs, begun in 1916, is published.
 Thomas Sharp's Pelican book Town Planning is published in the United Kingdom.
 November 9 – Major fire at Castle Howard in England.

Buildings and structures

Buildings completed
 Igreja Nossa Senhora do Brasil in São Paulo, Brazil.
 St. Mark's Church, Belgrade, Serbia.
 Church of St. Michael, Črna Vas, Slovenia, designed by Jože Plečnik.
 Timișoara Orthodox Cathedral, Timișoara, Romania.
 Grundtvig's Church, Bispebjerg, Copenhagen, Denmark, designed by Peder Vilhelm Jensen-Klint (d.1930) in 1913 and completed by his son Kaare Klint.
 Church and Priory of Christ the King, Cockfosters, London, designed by Dom Constantine Bosschaerts.
 Raleigh Hotel in Miami Beach, Florida, United States, designed by Lawrence Murray Dixon.
 Replacement Llao Llao Hotel at San Carlos de Bariloche, Argentina, designed by Alejandro Bustillo.
 Civic Centre of San Carlos de Bariloche, Argentina, designed by Ernesto de Estrada.
 New Bodleian Library in the University of Oxford, England, designed by Sir Giles Gilbert Scott.
 Atatürk Bridge, Istanbul, Turkey (the fourth bridge on this site).
 Eastern Michigan Motorbus Terminal in Ann Arbor, United States, designed by Banfield and Cumming with Douglas Loree.
 Detroit Arsenal (Warren, Michigan) Tank Plant, designed by Albert Kahn.
 Walton Yacht Works at Walton on Thames, England, designed by Jane Drew.
 No. 4 Boathouse at HMNB Portsmouth, England, designed by E. A. Scott.

Awards
 American Academy of Arts and Letters Gold Medal – William Adams Delano.
 RIBA Royal Gold Medal – Charles Voysey.

Births
 January 14 – Helmut Jahn, German-American architect
 March 26 – Jörg Streli, Austrian architect and academic (died 2019)
 May 31 – Lebbeus Woods, American architect and artist (died 2012)
 June 24 – Claude Vasconi, French architect (died 2009)
 September 3 – Frank Duffy, British architect

Deaths
 February 27 – Peter Behrens, German architect and designer (born 1868)
 March 24 – Thomas Adams, British urban planner (born 1871)
 June 11
 Alfred S. Alschuler, Chicago architect (born 1876)
 John A. Pearson, Canadian architect (born 1867)
 August 22 – Paul Gösch, German artist, architect, lithographer and designer (born 1885)
 October 20 – Gunnar Asplund, Swedish Nordic Classicist architect (born 1885)
 December 13 – Marc Camoletti, Swiss architect (born 1857)

References